Roman Harkusha  (born 2 June 1984) is a Belarusian former footballer.

External links
 
 
 

1984 births
Living people
Belarusian footballers
Association football defenders
Belarusian expatriate footballers
Expatriate footballers in Armenia
Armenian Premier League players
FC Darida Minsk Raion players
FC Energetik-BGU Minsk players
FC BATE Borisov players
FC Bereza-2010 players
FC Veras Nesvizh players
FC Ararat Yerevan players
FC Impuls Dilijan players
FC Gorodeya players
FC Smorgon players
FC Viktoryja Marjina Horka players